Flamberg may refer to:
Flame-bladed sword, a style of blade
Alexander Flamberg, a Polish chess master